is a subway station on the Tokyo Metro Chiyoda Line in Shibuya, Tokyo, Japan, operated by the Tokyo subway operator Tokyo Metro. It is numbered "C-02".

Station layout

Platforms

History
The station opened on October 20, 1972.

The station facilities were inherited by Tokyo Metro after the privatization of the Teito Rapid Transit Authority (TRTA) in 2004.

PASMO smart card coverage at this station began operation on 18 March 2007.

Passenger statistics
In fiscal 2013, the station was the least used on the Chiyoda Line and the 117th-busiest on the Tokyo Metro network with an average of 23,581 passengers daily. The passenger statistics for previous years are as shown below.

Surrounding area
 Yoyogi Park
 Yoyogi-Hachiman Station (Odakyu Odawara Line)

See also
 List of railway stations in Japan

References

External links
 Yoyogi-koen Station information (Tokyo Metro)

Tokyo Metro Chiyoda Line
Stations of Tokyo Metro
Railway stations in Tokyo
Buildings and structures in Shibuya
Railway stations in Japan opened in 1972